The LinnDrum Midistudio (also known as the Midistudio) was going to be an electronic musical instrument produced by Linn Electronics as the successor to the ill-fated Linn 9000, which was an integrated digital sampling drum machine and MIDI sequencer. The Midistudio is essentially a rack-mount version of the Linn 9000 with some improvements. It was revealed at the 1986 Winter NAMM Show in January for a list price of $5,990. However, it never went into production because Linn Electronics went out of business in February 1986.

Apparently, one prototype is in existence and was placed up for auction in 2008.
 For Sale: Roger Linn's original prototype MPC from 1986
 Auction on VEMIA listing the Linn MidiStudio - Auction details... Published on : 12/04/2008 - Here's the one and only prototype of Roger Linn's Midistudio...

History

The LinnDrum Midistudio and the LinnSequencer used the same flawed operating system used in the ill-fated  Linn 9000, released in 1984. Chronic software bugs led to a reputation for unreliability and contributed to the eventual demise of Linn Electronics.

The similarities between the LinnDrum Midistudio and the Akai MPC series, starting with the Akai MPC60, leads many to perceive a family resemblance. From a strictly chronological standpoint, the LinnDrum Midistudio did come after the Linn 9000 and before the Akai MPC60 and might well be called a step in the evolution of the Music Production Controllers of today.

At the time of writing (2015), many products, mostly software, bear the name "Midistudio". But in 1986, the LinnDrum Midistudio was, perhaps, one of the first to brandish that moniker.

Features
The LinnDrum Midistudio has sixteen 8-bit 10 kHz ~ 50 kHz digitally sampled drum sounds: bass, snare, cross stick, hihat, two crash symbols, two ride symbols, four toms, cabasa, tambourine, cowbell and clap. The Midistudio has virtually all the same features as the Linn 9000. Also, many optional 9000 features (like digital sampling capability and a floppy disk drive) are standard on the Midistudio.

Both machines have large (1.25-inch-square) velocity- and pressure-sensitive rubber performance pads. But the 9000 has 18 pads in a three-high by six-wide pattern, where the Midistudio has 16 pads in the distinctive, four-by-four pattern, that would become the hallmark of the Akai MPC series of Music Production Centers, starting with the Akai MPC60.

The Midistudio has some improvements, including a sampling rate of 10 kHz - 50 kHz (the 9000 is 11 kHz - 37 kHz) and (optionally) 16 trigger inputs (6 standard, optionally 12 maximum on the 9000).

The most distinctive difference between the machines is that the Midistudio has a rack-mountable chassis with a separate "lap pad" control panel that doubles as a protective cover for front panel in the rack-mount unit. The 9000 is a more traditional, one-piece drum machine chassis. They both feature an onboard mixer section providing real-time control over volume and pan. On the Midistudio, the sliders are in the rack, whereas on the 9000, they are on the one-piece, conventional drum machine control panel.

Brochure and gallery

References

External links
 Official Roger Linn site

Drum machines
Samplers (musical instrument)
Electronic musical instruments
Musical instruments invented in the 1980s
MIDI